Ian Sinclair  is a New Zealand television journalist and reporter. He currently works as a reporter for New Zealand current affairs show Sunday.

Awards and nominations
 2000 - Asia 2000 Journalism Award (won) 
 2009 - Investigation of the Year (won)

References

New Zealand broadcasters
Living people
Year of birth missing (living people)